Kristen Ann Cloke is an American actress. She was in the main cast of Space: Above and Beyond (1995–96), and has acted in several small parts of other TV series. She is known for her role as Valerie Lewton in Final Destination (2000) and as Leigh Colvin in the slasher film Black Christmas (2006). Cloke frequently appears in productions written, produced or directed by her husband, Glen Morgan.

Personal life
Cloke was born in the Van Nuys section of Los Angeles and attended California State University, Northridge. She is married to producer, writer, and director Glen Morgan, and has four children.

Career
Her first feature film role was the female lead in Megaville (1990), alongside Billy Zane.

Cloke's other credits include lead parts in Caged Fear and A Part of the Family. She has also had featured roles in Stay Tuned, Mistress, and The Marrying Man. Cloke's television credits include: Winnetka Road as Maybeth, Silk Stalkings as Annie Overstreet, and guest appearances on One West Waikiki, Cheers, Mad About You, Dear John, Murder She Wrote, Quantum Leap, Doogie Howser, MD, and Vengeance Unlimited.

In 1995, Cloke's breakout role came as Captain Shane Autumn Vansen on Space: Above and Beyond. The series was cancelled after one season, but resulted in her work as Vansen, a guest role in The X-Files episode "The Field Where I Died", which was written for her. She later described the episode as a love letter between herself and producer Glen Morgan, her then fiancé (now husband).

In 1996, she received a Daytime Emmy Award nomination for her performance in the ABC Afterschool Special episode  “The Long Road Home”, in which she played a young wife who has difficulty relating to her husband's son. In 1997-98, she had recurring role as Dr. Lara Means of the Millennium Group on Millennium.

On March 17, 2000, Cloke starred as Valerie Lewton in the film, Final Destination. , her most recent roles were in a 2017 episode of Lore and the 2017 film Lady Bird.

Filmography

Film

Television

Writer

References

External
 
 
 

Actresses from California
American film actresses
American television actresses
California State University, Northridge alumni
Living people
20th-century American actresses
21st-century American actresses
People from Van Nuys, Los Angeles
Year of birth missing (living people)